Joseph Dreher (15 May 1884 – 28 September 1941) was a French athlete.  He competed at the 1908 Summer Olympics in London. In the 1500 metres, Dreher placed fifth and last in his initial semifinal heat and did not advance to the final.

References

Sources
 
 
 
 Joseph Dreher's profile at Sports Reference.com

1884 births
1941 deaths
Olympic athletes of France
Athletes (track and field) at the 1908 Summer Olympics
French male long-distance runners
Medalists at the 1908 Summer Olympics
Olympic bronze medalists for France
Olympic bronze medalists in athletics (track and field)
19th-century French people
20th-century French people